Iridana euprepes is a butterfly in the family Lycaenidae first described by Hamilton Herbert Druce in 1905. It is found in the Democratic Republic of the Congo.

References

Butterflies described in 1905
Poritiinae
Endemic fauna of the Democratic Republic of the Congo